In American football, a position coach is a team official in charge of coaching a specific position group. Position coaches have more specialized duties than the head coach, assistant coach, and the offensive and defensive coordinators.

Common positions 
Common position coaches on coaching staffs in the National Football League and NCAA football include:
 Defensive line (DL) coach
 Linebacker (LB) coach
 Offensive line (OL) coach
 Quarterback (QB) coach
 Running backs (RB) coach
 Secondary (DB) coach. Responsible for coaching defensive backs, including safeties and cornerbacks
 Special teams coach. Responsible for coordinating punts, kickoffs, and field goals/extra points
 Tight ends (TE) coach
 Wide receivers (WR) coach

References 

American football occupations